The 2004 World Club Challenge was held on Friday, 13 February 2004, at the Alfred McAlpine Stadium, Huddersfield, England. The game was contested by Bradford Bulls and the Penrith Panthers.

Background

Bradford Bulls

Penrith Panthers

Match Summary

Teams

External links
2004 World Club Challenge at superleague.co.uk
2004 World Club Challenge at rugbyleagueproject.com
BBC Report

World Club Challenge
Bradford Bulls matches
Penrith Panthers matches
World Club Challenge
World Club Challenge
World Club Challenge